Rebore, vol. 1 is a 2000 album by experimental noise rock band Boredoms. It is the first of three in the Rebore series, and is a DJ remix by Unkle that contains samples from Boredoms' entire discography to that point.

Track listing
"Dysfunctional Monster Jam" – 46:01

Personnel
James Lavelle – compilation, mixing
Mitsukazu Tanaka – mastering
The Nextmen – scratching
Naohiro Ukawa and Ausgang – cover art
Masanobu Kondo – executive producer
Richard File – programming, compilation, mixing

References

Boredoms albums
2000 remix albums
Warner Music Group remix albums